Vijay Vikram Singh (born 26 September 1977), is an Indian voice-over artist and actor. He is the Narrator's voice behind the Indian Television series Bigg Boss. and many other Reality shows, Ad films etc. He is also an actor and he made his acting debut with The Family Man in 2019. He has also acted in Mirzapur 2 and Breathe 2. Vijay played the character of Commodore Chintamani Sharma in the Special Ops 1.5 on Hotstar. Vijay has also done many plays including playing Chanakya in an English Play titled "ALEXANDER VS CHANAKYA". Vijay has also done 8 shows of Hindi adaptation of Arthur Miller's play "All my Sons" called DORAHA.
Vijay is a celebrated Voice trainer and has trained Sanjana Sanghi(Dil bechara) and Sharvari Wagh(Bunty aur Babli 2) in Voice and diction.

Career 
Vijay Vikram Singh debuted started his Voice over career with Dance India Dance.

Vijay Vikram Singh debuted as an actor in The Family Man with Manoj Bajpayee.

Filmography

References

1977 births
Living people
Indian male voice actors
Bigg Boss
Place of birth missing (living people)